Phase Eight is a British women's wear clothing brand. The company has stores and concessions in the United Kingdom, Ireland, Switzerland, Germany, Sweden, Australia, UAE, and other countries.

History
Phase Eight was first established by Patsy Seddon in London in 1979 in a small boutique in Wandsworth Common. The name originated from a combination of P. Hayes, Patsy's maiden name, and the address of the first shop, 8 Bellevue Road. The retailer provides women's clothing designed in house, including Bridalwear and accessories.

Phase Eight was purchased by the South African retailer Foschini Group in 2015.

Stores
The retailer has 106 stores and 207 concessions in the UK, and 18 stores and 128 concessions internationally.

Internationally, Phase Eight opened four stores in Switzerland and seven concessions in Germany through its subsidiaries and joint venture partners in 2013.

References

External links
 

Clothing retailers of the United Kingdom
Retail companies established in 1979
Clothing companies established in 1979
Clothing brands of the United Kingdom
Retail companies based in London
1979 establishments in England